Limerick Museum, previously known as the Jim Kemmy Municipal Museum, is a city museum in Limerick, Ireland.

Foundation
The Limerick Museum was founded in 1907 and in the Carnegie Free Library and Museum building (established by Andrew Carnegie on Pery Square. Limerick Museum opened to the public in 1916 and remained in Pery Square until 1975. In 1979, the museum relocated to two restored houses in John Square. In 1998 the museum was moved again this time to Castle Lane where it opened to the public in 1999. In 2012, the museum was moved to a temporary location Civic Buildings, Merchant's Quay due to the refurbishment and expansion of King John's Castle (Limerick). In May 2017, it moved to the present location in the old Franciscans Friary on Henry Street.

The museum is run by Limerick City and County Council.

Limerick Museum received national recognition as a museum under the Cultural Institution Act 1997, which allowed it to become a designated museums of the collection of archaeological material. Before 1977 the Limerick city librarian was also the curator. The full-time museum curators included: Larry Walsh – 1977 to 2012.; Brian Hodkinson – 2012 to 2017; Dr Matthew Potter – 2017 to Present.

It has a collection of sixty-two thousand objects gathered through donations, purchase and long-term loan. In 2004, it became the first local authority in the state to have an online catalogue. In recent years, the number of visitors has increased from 13,000 in 2017 to 23,000 in 2018.

Exhibitions
The first exhibition was in 1940 to commemorate the centenary of the death of Limerick novelist Gerald Griffin. Since then there have been a series of exhibitions on various aspects of Limerick's history and culture. This gives an opportunity for the rotation of objects within the collection by topic. For example, in the Retrospective Exhibition (2014) the Charter of the City signed by King Charles II of England, a sword given to the city by Queen Elizabeth I of England as well as many other interesting items relating to civic life in the city were on display.

Noted Items in the Collection
 The largest meteorite ever to fall on the British Isles lands at Adare, County Limerick
 A rare intact Codd-neck bottle
 Largest collection of Limerick lace
 Selection of 18th and 19th Century Limerick Silver
 Scabbard used by Lord Edward Fitzgerald at his arrest in 1798
 Three Blunderbuss firearms
 Stone Age and Iron Age Archaeological finds
 A range of clothing including a gentleman's suit c.1706

See also 
 History of Limerick
 Limerick Museum and Archives
 Hunt Museum
 Limerick City Gallery of Art
 List of museums in the Republic of Ireland

References

External links 
 Limerick Museum website
 Limerick Museum on TripAdvisor

Museums established in 1906
Museums in County Limerick
Limerick
Local museums in the Republic of Ireland
Art museums and galleries in the Republic of Ireland
Education in Limerick (city)
History of Limerick (city)
1906 establishments in Ireland
Limerick (city)
Culture in Limerick (city)